The foreign relations of the Mughal Empire were characterized by competition with the Persian Empire to the west, the Marathas and others to the south, and the British to the east. Steps were taken by successive Mughal rulers to secure the western frontiers of India. The Khyber Pass along the Kabul- Qandhar route was the natural defence for India, and their foreign policy revolved around securing these outposts, as also balancing the rise of powerful empires in the region. During the break up of the Timurid Empire in the 15th century, the Ottomans in Turkey, the Safavids in Persia and the Uzbegs in central Asia emerged as the new contenders of power. While the Safavids were Shia by faith, Ottomans along with Uzbegs were Sunni. The Mughals were also Sunni and Uzbegs were their natural enemies, who caused Babur and other Timurid princes to leave Khurasan and Samarqand. The powerful Uzbegs who held sway over central India sought an alliance of Sunni powers to defeat the Shia ruled Persia, but Mughals were too broadminded to be driven away by the sectarian conflicts. The Mughal rulers, especially Akbar, were keen to develop strong ties with Persia in order to balance the warring Uzbegs. Thus, the foreign policy of Mughals was centred around strengthening the ties with Persia, while maintaining the balance of power in the region by keeping a check on the evolution of a united Uzbeg empire.

Mughals and the Uzbegs
When Uzbeg chief, Shaibani Khan was defeated by the Safavids in 1510, Babur was able to control Samarqand for a brief period of time. But, the Uzbegs soon struck back by defeating the Safavids and Babur lost the control over it. During this time, he was helped by the Safavids, which established a tradition of mutual friendship between the two empires. Later, Humayun was also given refuge by the Shah Tahmasp of Persia, when he was ousted from India by Sher Shah Suri. In 1572, 
Abdullah Khan Uzbeg captured Balkh and sent embassy to the court of Akbar, seeking the coalition of Sunni powers against Persia. But, Akbar admonished him, and in his reply, let him know, that mere sectarian strife was not a justifiable reason for conquest. Meanwhile, though Uzbegs had captured Balkh, which along with Badakhshan was ruled till 1585 by Timurids, he had no desire to be embroiled into a conflict with them until they threatened Mughal position in Kabul and Qandhar.

In his message sent to Akbar, Abdullah Uzbeg had also rose the issue of pilgrims to Mecca, who were facing difficulties due to unfavourable route traversing across Persian territory. Akbar convinced him that opening up of a new route from the Gujarat coast will bring the difficulties down. In 1584 Abdullah Uzbeg captured Badakhshan and the Timurid prince ruling over the area, Mirza Sulaiman along with his grandson were forced to seek refuge in Akbar's court, who were assigned suitable Mansab. Akbar felt Abdullah Uzbeg was a possible threat to Kabul, and hence in 1585, transferred his capital to Lahore. Meanwhile, he  immediately despatched an army under Raja Man Singh to occupy Kabul, who succeeded in doing so. Abdullah sent a second embassy which was received by Akbar. He was uneasy with the presence of Akbar at Attock at the time when Uzbeg and Mughal borders were running side by side.

According to historian Satish Chandra, both the Mughals and Uzbegs reached to an informal agreement, according to which Mughal gave up their claims in Balkh and Badkhshan while Uzbegs left Kabul and Qandhar for Mughals. Akbar, with the capture of Qandhar in 1595 was able to set up scientific frontier along the Hindukush. But, Akbar remained at Lahore till 1598, and left for Agra only after the death of Abdullah Khan.

Balkh campaign of Shah Jahan
In 1598 after the death of Abdullah Khan Uzbeg, the Uzbegs became ineffective to threaten Mughal position in North-West for a long period of time until a new Uzbeg ruler, Nazr Muhammad captured Balkh and Bokhara. Both Nazr Muhammad and his son Abdul Aziz were ambitious, and their control over the Balkh and Bokhara implied their future attempt to threaten Mughals in Kabul. Later, Abdul Aziz rebelled against his father and Nazr Muhammad was able to control only Balkh, which was also threatened by the activities of his son. Threatened by his rebel son, Nazr Muhammad sought the help of Shah Jahan who was keen to help as he wanted a friendly ruler at Bokhara. Shah Jahan ordered Prince Murad Baksh to march toward Balkh, and to help Nazr Muhammad in maintaining his hold upon his empire as well as to assist him in capturing Samarqand and Bokhara. Prince Murad marched as per the order but made a mistake by not waiting for the order of Nazr Muhammad and rushed Balkh in hurry. He also commanded his army to march into the fort of Balkh, in which Nazr Muhammad was seeking shelter.

The hasty action by the prince made Nazr Muhammad skeptical of his intention, and thus, he fled. Mughals occupied Balkh but they were soon attacked by Abdul Aziz, the rebel son of Nazr Muhammad who mustered an army of 1,20,000 to cross Oxus river and launch strike against the Mughals. Prince Murad who was unable to continue in the campaign was now replaced by prince Aurangzeb. Under the command of Aurangzeb, the Mughals routed Uzbegs under Abdul Aziz, in 1647, near Balkh. After the Mughal's success at Balkh, the prestige of Mughal army rose and the supporters of Abdul Aziz renounced him. Nazr Muhammad, who was taking refuge at Persia by then, started conversation with the Mughals for regaining his empire, and his claims were supported by Shah Jahan.

Nazr Muhammad was asked to submit personally and apologise to Aurangzeb, but According to Satish Chandra:

The unfriendly Uzbeg population of the Balkh and the harsh Winter accompanied by shortage of supplies made Mughals left in the same year(1647) in which Balkh was captured. The gain of Shah Jahan was his success in keeping Uzbeg divided and preventing a united Uzbeg state to rise, which could have been a danger to Mughals at Kabul. The motive of "Balkh campaign", as Shah Jahan's attempt to regain Mughal homeland of Samarqand and Fargana, and setting up a scientific frontier at Oxus, is discarded by Satish Chandra, as Oxus was hardly defensible and no serious attempt were made for the former.

Mughals and Iran

The relationship between Mughals and the Iran (Persia) was cordial but the Qandhar served as a bone of contention between them, being claimed by both. Qandhar was a strategic place and could serve as a better defence against any future onslaught from North-West. Before 1507, the year in which Uzbegs ousted the cousins of Babur from Qandhar, it was ruled by Timurid princes. For the Persians, Qandhar was not a strategic fort but for Mughals it was of much importance. It was well supplied with water, was necessary for protection of Kabul and controlling it implied the best way to keep a tab upon the Afghan and Baluch tribes who possessed a tribal sense of independence and were difficult to control otherwise. Qandhar was also a rich and fertile area and after conquest of Sindh and Baluchistan, Akbar was determined to capture it. Akbar also wanted to promote trade via it.

In 1522, Babur captured Qandhar following the disruption created by Uzbegs in Khurasan. But this victory was short lived as following the death of Humayun, Shah Tahmasp, the ruler of Persia at whose court Humayun had taken refuge after being ousted by Sher Shah Sur, captured it. In 1595, when Abdullah Khan Uzbeg captured Balkh and Badkhshan, the area ruled by Timurids till 1585, Akbar was forced to capture Qandhar in 1595 to make a defensible frontier against the Uzbegs. The relationship between Mughals and Persians remained cordial since then and embassies were frequently exchanged between the two until the reign of Jahangir came.

Initially in the reign of Jahangir, Nur Jahan served as a bridge between the Mughals and Persians, and due to her connections with the Persia, relationship remained cordial. In 1620, Shah Abbas 1, the ruler of Persia, sent a friendly request to Jahangir to return the Qandhar and subsequently made preparation for the expedition. Jahangir was surprised and he decided to send prince Khurram to Qandhar, but the prince put many impossible demands and was reluctant to move onto the campaign. This was the phase of tussle between Nur Jahan and Prince Khurram, who was supported by his father in law Asaf Khan. Thus, Qandhar passed into Persian hands by 1622. Shah Abbas 1 sent lavish embassies and costly gifts to erase the bitterness that developed in the mind of Jahangir after his failure at Qandhar, but the cordiality in the Mughal-Iran relationship came to an end.

In 1629, following the death of Shah Abbas 1, Shah Jahan, who succeeded Jahangir made the Persian governor Ali Mardan Khan to his side and formally Qandhar was retained by the Mughals in 1638. In 1647, the setback of Mughals at Balkh even after winning the war against Uzbegs emboldened the Persians to attack and conquer Qandhar (1649). The success of Aurangzeb in the battle against Uzbegs persuaded Shah Jahan to send him to Qandhar with an army of 50,000. Mughals under Aurangzeb though defeated Persians but were not able to capture the fort.

In total, Mughal made three attempts twice under Aurangzeb and once under Dara Shukoh, the elder son of Shah Jahan. But, able Persian commander and determined resistance made all the efforts waste. After ascending the throne, Aurangzeb, the successor of Shah Jahan, decided not to get embroiled into the Qandhar affair provided it had lost its strategic significance following the weakening of both Persians and Uzbegs. In 1668, the new ruler of Persia, Shah Abbas II insulted the Mughal envoy and made derogatory remarks on Aurangzeb. But, before any conflict happened, Shah Abbas II died and Persian danger to India faded away until Nadir Shah ascended the throne of Persia.

Mughal and Ottoman
Babur's early relations with the Ottomans were poor because the Selim I provided Babur's rival Ubaydullah Khan with powerful matchlocks and cannons. In 1507, when ordered to accept Selim I as his rightful suzerain, Babur refused and gathered Qizilbash servicemen in order to counter the forces of Ubaydullah Khan during the Battle of Ghazdewan in 1512. In 1513, Selim I reconciled with Babur (fearing that he would join the Safavids), dispatched Ustad Ali Quli and Mustafa Rumi, and many other Ottoman Turks, in order to assist Babur in his conquests; this particular assistance proved to be the basis of future Mughal-Ottoman relations. From them, he also adopted the tactic of using matchlocks and cannons in field (rather than only in sieges), which would give him an important advantage in India. Babur referred to this method as the "Ottoman device" due to its previous use by the Ottomans during the Battle of Chaldiran.

See also
 Religious policy of the Mughals after Akbar

References

Further reading
 
 

Mughal Empire
Wars involving the Mughal Empire
Medieval India